Chaibasa  Assembly constituency   is an assembly constituency of Chaibasa in  the Indian state of Jharkhand.

Members of Assembly 
2005: Putkar Hembrom, Bharatiya Janata Party
2009: Deepak Birua, Jharkhand Mukti Morcha
2014: Deepak Birua, Jharkhand Mukti Morcha
2019: Deepak Birua, Jharkhand Mukti Morcha

Election Results

2019

See also
List of constituencies of the Jharkhand Legislative Assembly

References

Assembly constituencies of Jharkhand